The following tables compare general and technical information for a number of file archivers. Please see the individual products' articles for further information. They are neither all-inclusive nor are some entries necessarily up to date. Unless otherwise specified in the footnotes section, comparisons are based on the stable versions—without add-ons, extensions or external programs.

Archivers 

Note: Archivers with names cell background highlighted in purple are no longer in development.

General information 
Basic general information about the archivers.

Notes:

Operating system support 
The operating systems the archivers can run on without emulation or compatibility layer. Ubuntu's own GUI Archive manager, for example, can  open and create many archive formats (including Rar archives) even to the extent of splitting into parts and encryption and ability to be read by the native program. This is presumably a "compatibility layer."

Notes:

Archiver features 
Information about what common archiver features are implemented natively (without third-party add-ons).

Notes:

Archive format support

Reading 
Information about what archive formats the archivers can read. External links lead to information about support in future versions of the archiver or extensions that provide such functionality. Note that gzip, bzip2 and xz are compression formats rather than archive formats.

Notes:

Writing 
Information about what archive formats the archivers can write and create. External links lead to information about support in future versions of the archiver or extensions that provide such functionality. Note that gzip, bzip2 and xz are compression formats rather than archive formats.

Notes:
  Tar implementations call the external programs gzip and bzip2, 7z, xz, ... to perform compression; these external programs usually come with systems that contain tar.
  Requires rar.exe from WinRAR.
  Requires external program(if you are using WinZip 11.1 or earlier).
  Requires Ace32.exe from WinAce.
  The Extractor and XAD are not included in this list because they only expand archives.
  ALZip can also write to the following formats: BH, JAR, and LZH
  Updating archives is not supported.
  Requires external program.
 Stuffit supported file formats
  Ark is a front-end only and requires appropriate command-line programs be installed. Programs like bzip2, gzip, tar, zip usually come with systems that contain Ark; writing in .rar format requires a commercial program.
  Xarchiver is a front-end only and requires appropriate command-line programs be installed. Programs like bzip2, gzip, tar, zip usually come with systems that contain Xarchiver; writing in .rar format requires a commercial program.
  Archive Manager (previously known as "File Roller") is a front-end only and requires appropriate command-line programs be installed. Programs like bzip2, gzip, tar, zip usually come with systems that contain Archive Manager. writing in .rar format requires a commercial program.
  If there are more than one, files must be grouped in a .tar before being compressed.
  supports the formats as stream compression of  other archive format and can create compressed format like tar.bz2 or iso.xz but cannot create an archive in these formats
  it is possible to open war and jar files to extract e add/replace file; files war and jar are still valid after that
  it require console rar.exe, and the path to it -- specified in Options . it can be taken from WinRAR software . PowerArchiever also doesn't support separate definition of the Dictionary Size and Compression Method .

Uncommon archive format support 
PeaZip has full support for Brotli, Zstandard, various LPAQ and PAQ formats, QUAD / BALZ / BCM (highly efficient ROLZ based compressors), FreeArc format, and for its native PEA format.
 
7-Zip includes read support for .msi, cpio and xar, plus Apple's dmg/HFS disk images and the deb/.rpm package distribution formats; beta versions (9.07 onwards) have full support for the LZMA2-compressed .xz format.

See also 
 Comparison of archive formats
 Lossless compression benchmarks
 Comparison of file systems
 List of archive formats
 List of file systems

References

Further reading 
 Maximum Compression site benchmarking compressors for several filetypes (text, executable, jpeg etc.).
 Kingsley G. Morse Jr., "Compression Tools Compared", Linux Journal, issue 137, September 2005
 Patrick Schmid, Achim Roos, (March 10, 2010) "Four Compression And Archiving Solutions Compared", Tom's Hardware

 
File archivers